Circus Contraption (founded in 1998) was the name of a one-ring circus, vaudeville and dark cabaret troupe based in Seattle, Washington. The troupe, which employs about a dozen performers, uses live, original music paired with old-style circus performances, heavily influenced by cabaret and vaudeville acts. The shows are conceived for adults and usually feature some mature content.

The troupe first performed at the Seattle Fringe Theatre Festival, but soon branched out to other venues around the U.S., including a U.S. tour in 2005.  Their local and touring shows, with names like "Bracing Curative," "Eat Circus," "The Beer, Bread & Cheese Cabaret," "A Raree Show," and "Gallimaufry: An Evening of Jiggery-Pokery," played to sold-out audiences.

The troupe disbanded in 2009.  Joe Albanese (aka Dexter Mantooth) and Drew Keriakedes (aka Shmootzi the Clod) and three other victims were killed in the Cafe Racer shooting on May 30, 2012.

Members 
Principal members
 Joseph Vito "Dexter Mantooth" Albanese – bassist, leather craftsman
 Evelyn "Acrophelia" Bittner – acrobat, costumer, stilt walker
 Sari "Pinky d'Ambrosia" Breznau – costumer, vocalist, trumpeter, dancer
 Erin Brindley – managing director
 David "Armitage Shanks" Crellin – co-founder, ringmaster, vocalist, percussionist, songwriter, maskmaker, fire-eater
 Max "Fresco Rose" Davis – acrobat, aerialist, dancer
 Colin "Ernesto Cellini" Ernst – juggler, trombonist, welder, contraption engineer, composer
 Kevin "Chameleo" Hinshaw – clarinetist, music director, pianist, composer, webmaster, director of small packages
 Jenny "Nova Jo Yaco" Iacobucci –  dancer, stilt walker, puppeteer, costumer
 Drew "Shmootzie the Clod" Keriakedes – sousaphonist, ukulelist, accordionist, banjo player, vocalist, songwriter
 Whitney "Delphinia Spit" Lawless – clown, acrobat, costumer
 Matt "Bunny LaMonte" Manges – drummer, aerialist, acrobat, songwriter, stuntman
 Kari "Sally Pepper" Podgorski – aerialist, dancer, acrobat, costumer, stilt walker
 Terry "The Carnie" Podgorski – production manager, set designer
 Orycteropus "Ory" Afer – mascot
 Lara "Darty Kangoo" Paxton – co-founder, artistic director, aerialist, dancer, costumer, acrobat, stilt walker, fortune teller
 Hugh "Salamity Clam" Sutton – accordionist, pianist
 Jeff "Buster Speck" Walker – trombonist
 Annastasia "Esmeralda Diamond" Workman – accordion player, piano player
 Jason "Dr. Loligo Calamari" Williams – acrobat, rigger, contraption engineer, stilt walker

Occasional guest stars
 Greg "Harold Smaude" Adair – accordionist, painter and illustrator
 Pavel Merzo – clown
 James Jay – juggler
 Melissa Kerber – aerialist
 Spencer and Gary "The Twins" Luke – unknown

Discography
Our Latest Catalogue CD (2001)
Gallimaufry CD (2004)
Grand American Traveling Dime Museum CD (2005)
The Half Wit's Descent CD (2008)
The Show to End All Shows CD (2010)

References

External links
So Long

Circuses
Dark cabaret musicians
Vaudeville